Melstacorp PLC is a Sri Lankan diversified conglomerate. It is listed in the Colombo Stock Exchange. Melstacorp PLC is one of the 10 largest listed companies. It has a market capitalization of approximately USD 450 million. Deshamanya Harry Jayawardena is the Chairman of the company.

History

Melstacorp PLC was originally formed as Beruwala Distillery (Private) Limited in 1995. Distilleries Company of Sri Lanka (DCSL) acquired the Company and renamed it Melstacorp Limited in order to subsequently make it the holding Company of the then DCSL group. All subsidiary companies of DCSL were transferred to the Company between 2010 and 2015. In 2016 through a 180-degree share swap, Melstacorp became the holding company of DCSL.

After the share swap, Melstacorp was listed in the Colombo Stock Exchange on 30 December 2016.

Subsidiaries 
Melstacorp subsidiaries are involved in industries such as Distilling, bottling and distribution of liquor, Insurance, Health, Manufacturing, Logistics, ICT, Telecommunications, Energy, Tea and Rubber Plantations, Hospitality, Property Development, Brand Management, and in Advertising. 

It is the holding company of Distilleries Company of Sri Lanka PLC.

Source: Annual Report (2022, p. 152)

References 

Conglomerate companies of Sri Lanka
Distilleries Company of Sri Lanka
Drink companies of Sri Lanka
Companies listed on the Colombo Stock Exchange